Shirpur may refer to:
Shirpur, Afghanistan, a village in Afghanistan
Shirpur, a city in India
Shirpur Taluka, a tehsil in Dhule District, Marharastra, India
Shirpur (Vidhan Sabha constituency), a constituency in western India
Shirpur Assembly Constituency, in India
Shirpur-Warwade, a city in Maharashtra, India
Shirpur Gold Refinery, a gold refinery in India